The Indonesia Economic and Trade Office to Taipei is the de facto embassy of Indonesia in Taiwan. Indonesia's official diplomatic relations with the People's Republic of China (PRC) were established in 1950 had the acknowledgment of the "one-China policy" leading to the opening of the representative office in 1970 as an office of Indonesian Chamber of Commerce and Industry (KADIN) in the absence of diplomatic relations. It adopted its present name in 1995.

Its counterpart body in Indonesia is the Taipei Economic and Trade Office in Jakarta.

See also 
 Taipei Economic and Trade Office, Jakarta, Indonesia
 List of diplomatic missions in Taiwan
 List of diplomatic missions of Indonesia

References

Taipei
1970 establishments in Taiwan
Representative Offices in Taipei
Indonesia–Taiwan relations
Organizations established in 1970